Alfred James Lambe (28 June 1904 – 29 April 1976) was an Australian rules footballer who played for the North Melbourne Football Club and Footscray Football Club in the Victorian Football League (VFL).

Notes

External links 

1904 births
1976 deaths
Australian rules footballers from Victoria (Australia)
North Melbourne Football Club players
Western Bulldogs players